Obages tuberculosus is a species of beetle in the family Cerambycidae. It was described by Stephan von Breuning in 1973. It is known from Malaysia.

References

Morimopsini
Beetles described in 1973